Macotasa is a genus of moths in the family Erebidae. The genus was erected by Frederic Moore in 1878.

Species
Macotasa biplagella (Butler, 1877)
Macotasa dimorpha (Hampson, 1918)
Macotasa nedoshivinae Dubatolov, 2012
Macotasa nubecula (Moore, 1879)
Macotasa nubeculoides Holloway, 1982
Macotasa orientalis (Hampson, 1905)
Macotasa suffusus (Talbot, 1926)
Macotasa tetraspila Černý, 2009
Macotasa tortricoides (Walker, 1862)

References

Lithosiina
Moth genera